The Dictionary of Modern American Philosophers is a 2005 four-volume biographical reference work edited by John R. Shook, then of Oklahoma State University, published by Thoemmes Continuum. Its consulting editors were Richard T. Hull, Bruce Kuklick, Murray G. Murphey and John G. Slater.  It was published online by Oxford Reference Online in 2010. 

The Dictionary was reviewed in Library Journal by Edin Hadzic. The review notes that it "covers philosophical thought in the United States and Canada from 1860 to 1960". "The term philosopher is employed somewhat loosely" and "lack  of sustained focus  on philosophy in a narrower sense is an essential drawback". The Dictionary "seeks to countervail deep-seated prejudices by  heavily representing women and minorities."

References 

 D. Hurst (2013) Current Reviews for Academic Libraries

2005 non-fiction books
United States biographical dictionaries
Continuum International Publishing Group books